Asian Games records in the sport of track cycling are ratified by the Asian Cycling Confederation (ACC).

Men's records

Women's records

References

External links
Asian Cycling Confederation

Track cycling records
Cycling
Cycling at the Asian Games
Asian Games